Valentinian III (2 July 41916 March 455) was Roman emperor in the West from 425 to 455. Made emperor in childhood, his reign over the Roman Empire was one of the longest, but was dominated by powerful generals vying for power amid civil wars and the invasions of Late Antiquity's Migration Period, including the campaigns of Attila the Hun.

He was the son of Galla Placidia and Constantius III, and as the great-grandson of Valentinian I he was the last emperor of the Valentinianic dynasty. As a grandson of Theodosius I, Valentinian was also a member of the Theodosian dynasty, to which his wife, Licinia Eudoxia, also belonged. A year before assuming the rank of augustus, Valentinian was given the imperial rank of caesar by his half-cousin and co-emperor Theodosius II. The augusta Galla Placidia had great influence during her son's rule. During his early reign Aetius, Felix, and the comes africae, Bonifacius all competed for power within the western empire.  Eventually Aetius would defeat Felix and Bonifacius. Aetius would go on to campaign against the many Germanic tribes invading the empire.

During Valentinian's reign the Huns invaded the Roman Empire. Eventually Aetius would defeat the Huns at the Battle of the Catalaunian Plains. Once the Huns returned, Pope Leo I and two other senators convinced Attila to leave. Valentinian himself killed Aetius, and in response Aetius's bodyguards assassinated Valentinian. Valentinian's reign was marked by the ongoing collapse of the western empire.

Family and infancy 
Valentinian was born in the western capital of Ravenna, the only son of Galla Placidia and Flavius Constantius. His mother was the younger half-sister of the western emperor Honorius, while his father was at the time a patrician and the power behind the throne.

Through his mother, Valentinian was a descendant both of Theodosius I, who was his maternal grandfather, and of Valentinian I, who was the father of his maternal grandmother. It was also through his mother's side of the family that he was the nephew of Honorius and first cousin to Theodosius II (the son of Honorius' brother Arcadius), who was eastern emperor for most of Valentinian's life. Valentinian had a full sister, Justa Grata Honoria, who was probably born in 417 or 418 (the history of Paul the Deacon mentions her first when mentioning the children of the marriage, suggesting she was the eldest). His mother had previously been married to Ataulf of the Visigoths, and had borne a son, Theodosius, in Barcelona in 414; but the child had died early in the following year, thus eliminating an opportunity for a Romano-Visigothic line.

When Valentinian was less than two years old, Honorius appointed Constantius co-emperor, a position he would hold until his death seven months later. As a result of all these family ties, Valentinian was the son, grandson, great-grandson, cousin, and nephew (twice over) of Roman emperors.

In either 421 or 423, Valentinian was given the title of nobilissimus by Honorius, although this title was not initially recognized in the eastern court of Theodosius II. After the death of his father in 421, Valentinian followed his mother and his sister (Justa Grata Honoria) to Constantinople, when court intrigue saw Galla Placidia forced to flee from her half-brother, the emperor Honorius, and the young Valentinian went to live at the court of his cousin Theodosius II.

Early Reign (423–437)

Caesar 
In 423, Honorius died, and his primicerius notariorum, Joannes took power in Rome. To counter this threat to his power, Theodosius belatedly recognised Valentinian's father as augustus and nominated the 5-year-old Valentinian caesar for the West in October 23, 424. Theodosius also betrothed him to his own daughter Licinia Eudoxia (whom Valentinian would eventually marry in 437 when he was 18). It was only in the following year, after Joannes had been defeated in a combined naval and land campaign, that Valentinian was installed by the eastern patricius et magister officiorum, Helion, as augustus in Rome, on October 23, 425, at the age of six.

Augustus 
Given his minority, the new augustus ruled under the influence of his mother Galla Placidia, one of whose first acts was to install Felix as the magister utriusque militiae in the west. This period was marked by a vigorous imperial policy and an attempt to stabilize the western provinces as far as the stretched resources of the empire could manage.

In 425, the court at Ravenna negotiated with the Huns who had accompanied Flavius Aetius to Italy in support of Joannes. They agreed to leave Italy, and to evacuate the province of Pannonia Valeria, which was returned to the empire. This allowed Felix and the imperial government to restructure the defences along the Danubian provinces in 427 and 428. In addition, there were significant victories over the Visigoths in Gaul in 426/7 and 430 and the Franks along the Rhine in 428 and 432.

Nevertheless, there were significant problems that threatened the viability of the Roman state in the west. The Visigoths were a constant presence in south-eastern Gaul and could not be dislodged. The Vandals in Hispania continued their incursions, and, in 429, they commenced their invasion of Mauretania Tingitana. The loss of these territories seriously impacted the state's ability to function. The burden of taxation became more and more intolerable as Rome's power decreased, and the loyalty of its remaining provinces was seriously impaired in consequence.

In addition, the initial period of Valentinian's reign was dominated by the struggle among the leaders of the three principal army groups of the west – Flavius Felix, the senior magister militum praesentalis, Bonifacius, the magister militum per Africam and Flavius Aetius, the magister militum per Gallias. In 427, Felix accused Bonifacius of treason and demanded that he return to Italy. Bonifacius refused and defeated an army sent by Felix to capture him. Weakened, Felix was unable to resist Aetius who, with the support of Galla Placidia, replaced him as magister militum praesentalis in 429, before having him killed in 430.

Bonifacius, in the meantime, had been unable to defeat Sigisvultus, whom Galla Placidia had sent to deal with the rebel. Bonifacius, therefore, entered into an agreement with the Vandals to come to his aid and, in return, they would divide the African provinces between themselves. Concerned by this turn of events and determined to hold onto the African provinces at all costs, the court at Ravenna sought reconciliation with Bonifacius, who agreed in 430 to affirm his allegiance to Valentinian III and stop the Vandal king Gaiseric.

In 431, Bonifacius was crushed and fled to Italy, abandoning western North Africa. The imperial court, and especially Galla Placidia, worried about the power being wielded by Aetius, stripped him of his command and gave it to Bonifacius. In the civil war that followed, Bonifacius defeated Aetius at the Battle of Ravenna, but died of his wounds. Aetius fled to the Huns and, with their help, was able to persuade the court to reinstate him to his old position of magister militum praesentalis in 434. As a consequence, in 435, Valentinian was forced to conclude a peace with Gaiseric, whereby the Vandals kept all their possessions in North Africa in return for a payment of tribute to the empire, while the Huns were granted new territory in Pannonia Savia to occupy.

Galla Placidia's regency came to an end in 437 when Valentinian travelled to Constantinople to marry his fiancée, Licinia Eudoxia. On his return to Rome, he was nominally the emperor, but in truth the management of imperial policy in the west was in the hands of Aetius.

Ascendancy of Aetius (437–455)
From 436 to 439, Aetius was focused on the situation in Gaul. Serious Gothic defeats in 437 and 438 were undone by a Roman defeat in 439, which saw the status quo restored through a new truce. He also enjoyed initial success against the Franks and the Burgundians, as well as putting down a revolt by the Bagaudae by 437. In 438, peace was also achieved with the Suebi in Spain, the same year Valentinian's daughter, Eudocia, was born.

As Aetius was completely occupied with events in Gaul, Valentinian was unable to do anything to prevent the Vandals completely overrunning the remaining western African provinces, culminating in the fall of Carthage on 19 October 439. This was a major blow because taxes and foodstuffs from these wealthy provinces supported Rome. By 440, Vandal fleets were ravaging Sicily and Aetius coordinated a joint response with the eastern court, which saw large numbers of troops arriving in Sicily, with the intent of attacking Gaiseric.

These plans were abandoned when pressure from the Huns forced the transfer of these troops to the Danube to repulse the Hunnic invasions. Therefore, in 442, Aetius and Valentinian were forced to acknowledge the Vandal conquests of Proconsular Africa, Byzacena, and western Numidia, in exchange for which Rome was returned the now devastated provinces of Tripolitana, Mauretania Sitifensis, Mauretania Caesariensis, and part of Numidia. Regardless, however, Gaiseric had soon retaken Mauretania Sitifensis and Mauretania Caesariensis, as well as taking Sardinia and Corsica, and conducting devastating raids on Sicily.

Therefore, Aetius was determined that, if they could not prevent Gaiseric wreaking havoc by military means, then perhaps linking him to the imperial dynasty would be the next best thing. Consequently, sometime before 446, he convinced Valentinian to agree to a marriage between his eldest daughter, Eudocia, and Gaiseric's son, Huneric. Unfortunately, Huneric was already married to the daughter of the king of the Visigoths, so the idea was abandoned.

Hispania as well continued to slip away from imperial control during the early to mid 440s as the Suebi extended their control. By 444, all the Spanish provinces bar Hispania Tarraconensis had been lost to the Germanic tribe and even Tarraconensis was under pressure due to continued Bagaudic uprisings. As a consequence of these territorial losses, by the mid 440s the state was experiencing severe financial problems, with the government openly acknowledging that there was insufficient revenue to meet the military needs of the Roman state. The emperor issued a law on 14 July 444, stripping the bureaucrats of their exemptions from the recruitment tax.

In that year, two additional taxes were issued in Valentinian's name, one a sales tax of around four percent and another on the senatorial class, specifically to raise new troops as well as feeding and clothing them. Senators of illustrious rank were required to contribute the money for maintaining three soldiers, senators of the second class money for one soldier, and senators of the third class one-third the cost of maintaining a soldier. Even Valentinian himself was not exempt and he was forced to sacrifice part of his income and use the reduced contents of his personal income to help the State in its financial straits.

Hunnic invasions

The Huns continued to pressure the Danubian provinces in the 440s. Sometime before 449, Valentinian granted the honorary title of magister militum of the western empire upon their chieftain, Attila the Hun, and the western court was relieved when he concentrated on raiding the eastern empire's provinces in the Balkans from 441 through to 449. In 449, Attila received a message from Honoria, Valentinian III's sister, offering him half the western empire if he would rescue her from an unwanted marriage that her brother was forcing her into.

Attila had been looking for a pretext for invading the West and was allegedly bribed by the Vandal king Gaiseric to attack the Visigoths in Gaul. In 450, he invaded the Gallic provinces, after securing peace with the eastern court. Valentinian was furious over the invasion. The man Honoria sent to Attila with the offer was tortured to reveal all the details of the arrangement and then beheaded. It took a great deal of persuading for Valentinian's mother to get her son to agree to spare his sister's life.

In early 451, Attila crossed the Rhine and entered the Belgic provinces, capturing Divodurum Mediomatricum (Metz) on April 7, 451, Aetius gathered together a coalition of forces, including Visigoths and Burgundians, and raced to prevent Attila from taking the city of Aurelianum (Orléans), successfully forcing the Huns to beat a hasty retreat. The Roman-Germanic forces met Hunnic forces at the Battle of the Catalaunian Plains, resulting in a victory for Aetius, who sought to retain his position by allowing Attila and a significant number of his troops to escape.

This allowed Attila to regroup, and, in 452, Attila invaded Italy. He sacked and destroyed Aquileia and took Verona and Vincentia (Vicenza) as well. Aetius was shadowing the Huns but did not have the troops to attack, so the road to Rome was open. Although Ravenna was Valentinian's usual residence, he and the court eventually moved back to Rome, where he was as Attila approached.

Valentinian sent Pope Leo I and two leading senators to negotiate with Attila. This embassy, combined with a plague among Attila's troops, the threat of famine, and news that the Eastern Emperor Marcian had launched an attack on Hun homelands along the Danube, forced Attila to turn around and leave Italy. The death of Attila in Pannonia in 453 and the power struggle that erupted between his sons ended the Hunnic threat to the empire.

Assassination
With the Hun invasion thwarted, Valentinian felt secure enough to begin plotting to have Aetius killed, egged on by Petronius Maximus, a high ranking senator who bore Aetius a personal grudge, and his chamberlain, the eunuch Heraclius. Aetius, whose son had married Valentinian's youngest daughter, Placidia, was murdered by Valentinian on 21 September 454. The ancient historian Priscus reported that Aetius was presenting a financial statement before the Emperor when Valentinian suddenly leapt from his throne and accused him of drunken depravity. He held him responsible for the empire's tribulations and accused him of plotting to take the empire away from him. Valentinian then drew his sword and together with Heraclius, rushed at the weaponless Aetius and struck him on the head, killing him on the spot. When Valentinian later boasted that he had done well to dispose of Aetius in such a way, a counsellor famously replied "Whether well or not, I do not know. But know that you have cut off your right hand with your left."

On March 16 of the following year, indeed, the emperor himself was assassinated in Rome by two Scythian followers of Aetius: Optelas and Thraustelas. According to Priscus, these men were put up to it by Petronius Maximus, whose aims of political advancement were thwarted by Heraclius. He may also have been taking revenge for the rape of his wife Lucina by Valentinian. The assassination occurred as Valentinian rode his horse on the Campus Martius. As the emperor dismounted to practise archery, the conspirators attacked. Optelas struck Valentinian on the side of the head, and when he turned to see who had hit him, Optelas delivered the death-blow. Meanwhile, Thraustelas slew Heraclius. Priscus reports a curious occurrence: as the emperor lay dead, a swarm of bees appeared and sucked up his blood.

The day after the assassination Petronius Maximus had himself proclaimed emperor by the remnants of the Western Roman army after paying a large donative. He was not as prepared as he thought to take over and stabilize the depleted empire, however; after a reign of only 11 weeks, Maximus was stoned to death by a Roman mob. King Gaiseric and his Vandals captured Rome a few days later and sacked it for two weeks.

Character and legacy

Valentinian's reign is marked by the dismemberment of the Western Empire; by the time of his death, virtually all of North Africa, all of western Spain, and the majority of Gaul had passed out of Roman hands. He is described as spoiled, pleasure-loving, and heavily influenced by sorcerers and astrologers, yet devoted to religion, contributing to churches of Saint Lawrence in both Rome and Ravenna.

He also gave greater authority to the Papacy. On 6 June 445, he issued a decree which recognized the primacy of the bishop of Rome based on the merits of Saint Peter, the dignity of the city, and the Nicene Creed (in their interpolated form); ordained that any opposition to his rulings, which were to have the force of ecclesiastical law, should be treated as treason; and provided for the forcible extradition by provincial governors of anyone who refused to answer a summons to Rome. Valentinian was also consumed by trivialities: during the 430s, he began expelling all Jews from the Roman army because he was fearful of their supposed ability to corrupt the Christians they were serving with.

Some historians throughout 18th to 20th century, including Edward Gibbon and John Bagnall Bury, had unfavourable views of Valentinian III.

References

Primary sources

Prosper Chronicles
Jordanes, Gothic History see The Gothic History of Jordanes
Sidonius Apollinaris

Secondary sources

Blockley, R. C., The Dynasty of Theodosius in The Cambridge Ancient History: The Late Empire, A.D. 337–425 (ed. Averil Cameron and Peter Garnsey) (1998), pgs. 111–138

Heather, Peter, The Western Empire 425–76 in The Cambridge Ancient History: Late antiquity : empire and successors, A.D. 425–600 (ed. Averil Cameron and Bryan Ward-Perkins) (2000), pgs. 1–32
Martindale, J. R., The Prosopography of the Later Roman Empire, Vol. II, Cambridge University Press (1980)
Bury, J. B., A History of the Later Roman Empire from Arcadius to Irene, Vol. I (1889)

Oost, Galla Placidia Augusta, University Press, Chicago, 1968.
Jones, A.H.M., The Later Roman Empire A.D. 284–602, Volume One. Johns Hopkins University Press, Baltimore, 1986.
Elia, Fibronia, Valentiniano III, CULC, Catania, 1999.
McEvoy, Meaghan A. (2013), Child Emperor Rule in the Late Roman West, A.D. 367–455. Oxford: Oxford University Press.

External links

This list of Roman laws of the fourth century shows laws passed by Valentinian III relating to Christianity.
Mathisen, Ralph, "Valentinian III", De Imperatoribus Romanis.

 
419 births
455 deaths
5th-century Christians
5th-century murdered monarchs
5th-century Roman emperors
5th-century Roman consuls
Ancient child monarchs
Caesars (heirs apparent)
Imperial Roman consuls
Murdered Roman emperors
Nobilissimi
People from Ravenna
Sons of Roman emperors
Theodosian dynasty
Valentinianic dynasty